Storrs is a surname. Notable people with the surname include:

Margaret Storrs Grierson (1900–1997), American academic and archivist
Cherilla Storrs Lowrey (1861–1918), American educator and clubwoman
Elizabeth Storrs Mead (1832–1917), American educator
Charles and Augustus Storrs, business partners and brothers who founded the University of Connecticut in 1881
Charles Backus Storrs (1794–1833), first President of Western Reserve College and Preparatory School
Francis Storrs (1883–1918), British academic and intelligence agent
George Storrs (1796–1879), American preacher, Christian writer, and editor
George Harry Storrs (1860–1909), British murder victim
Henry R. Storrs (1787–1837), U.S. Representative from New York
John Storrs (sculptor) (1885–1956), American modernist sculptor
John Storrs (architect) (1920–2003), America architect who designed the World Forestry Center in Oregon
John Storrs (priest) (1846–1928), Anglican priest, Dean of Rochester
Monica Storrs (1888–1967), British-born Canadian pioneer and Anglican missionary
Nancy Storrs (born 1950), American rower
Richard Salter Storrs (1821–1900), American Congregational clergyman
Sir Ronald Storrs (1881–1955), British Imperial administrator
Suzanne Storrs (1934–1995), American actor
J. Storrs Hall, scientist in the field of molecular nanotechnology